KDLG is a non-commercial, public and community radio station in Dillingham, Alaska, broadcasting on 670 AM. Station programming includes a mix of nationally available NPR shows, Alaska Public Radio Network and local news, and music. It came on the air in 1975. KDLG is a Class A station broadcasting on the clear-channel frequency of 670 kHz.

Like most public broadcasters, the station seeks contributions from listeners via annual fund-drives but, unlike most, does not give those contributors a direct vote on the management or programming of the station.  The broadcasting license and management is entirely held by the Dillingham Public School District.

The station features services unique to the community, such as radio programs like Open Line, a call-in show; Bristol Bay Messenger, a messaging service for listeners in remote areas; the Trading Post, an on-air classifieds of items for sale or trade; and Economic Opportunities, which lists job openings by private employers and fishermen — as well as syndicated programs such as the weekly Pink Floyd show "Floydian Slip."

Programming is repeated on co-owned KIGG in Igiugig and KTOG in Togiak, and on KNSA in Unalakleet, a station owned by Unalakleet Broadcasting:

External links
 
 
 
 
 
 

DLG
DLG
NPR member stations
Radio stations established in 1976
1976 establishments in Alaska